The numbers game, also known as the numbers racket, the Italian lottery, Mafia lottery or the daily number, is a form of illegal gambling or illegal lottery played mostly in poor and working class neighborhoods in the United States, wherein a bettor attempts to pick three digits to match those that will be randomly drawn the following day. For many years the "number" has been the last three digits of "the handle", the amount race track bettors placed on race day at a major racetrack, published in racing journals and major newspapers in New York.

Gamblers place bets with a bookmaker ("bookie") at a tavern, bar, barber shop, social club, or any other semi-private place that acts as an illegal betting parlor. Runners carry the money and betting slips between the betting parlors and the headquarters, called a numbers bank.

Closely related is policy, known as the policy racket, or the policy game. The name "policy" is based on the similarity to cheap insurance, which is also a gamble on the future.

History
"Policy shops", where bettors choose numbers, operated in the United States prior to 1860. In 1875, a report of a select committee of the New York State Assembly stated that "the lowest, meanest, worst form ... [that] gambling takes in the city of New York, is what is known as policy playing." It flourished especially in working class African American and Italian American communities across the country, though it was also played to a lesser extent in many working class Irish-American and Jewish-American communities. It was known in Cuban-American and Puerto Rican communities as bolita ("little ball").

Other sources date the origin of Policy, at least in its most well-known form, to 1885 in Chicago. During part of its run from 1868 to 1892, the Louisiana Lottery involved drawing several numbers from 1 to 78, and people wagering would choose their own numbers on which to place a bet. Initially, it instead ran by means of the sale of serially-numbered tickets, and at another point, the numbers drawn ran from 1 to 75.

By the early 20th century, the game was associated with poor and working-class communities, as it could be played for as little as a penny. Also, unlike state lotteries, bookies could extend credit to the bettors and policy winners could avoid paying income tax. Different policy banks would offer different rates, although a payoff of 600 to 1 was typical. Since the odds of winning were 999:1 against the bettors, the expected profit for racketeers was enormous.

Boston
In Boston (as well as elsewhere in the Northeast), the game was commonly referred to as the "nigger pool", including in the city's newspapers, due to the game's popularity in black neighborhoods. The number was based on the handle from the early races at Suffolk Downs or, if Suffolk was closed, one of the racetracks in New York. The winner could be controlled by manipulating the handle.

After Jerry Angiulo became head of the Mafia in Boston, in 1950, he established a profit sharing plan whereby for every four numbers one of his runners turned in, they would get one for free. This resulted in the numbers game taking off in Boston. According to Howie Carr, The Boston American was able to stay in business in part because it published the daily number.

During the 1950s, Wimpy and Walter Bennett ran a numbers ring in Boston's Roxbury neighborhood. The Bennetts' protégé Stephen Flemmi took and collected bets for them.

Around the same time, Buddy McLean began forming a gang in Somerville, Massachusetts to, among other criminal activities, run numbers. This would become the Winter Hill Gang. By the 1970s, the Winter Hill Gang, then led by Whitey Bulger, moved bookies under its protection away from the numbers game to sports betting, as the state was starting its own lottery. Despite the creation of the state lottery, the numbers game's demise in Massachusetts was not immediate, as the state lottery had a lower payout and was taxed.

Chicago
In the 1940s, Eddie Jones and his brothers earned more than $180,000 per week in the black community. While in jail for income tax evasion, Jones became acquainted with Sam Giancana, a hit-man for hire among top Italian Mafia figures. Back on the streets, the men became friends. Jones taught Giancana everything he knew about the policy game and how to memorize number combinations, and even hired Giancana to operate one of his many establishments.

Giancana made his first fortune through Jones. Aspiring to become a "made man", Giancana shared his knowledge of the policy game with the Dons, who were impressed. The Italian Mafia then focused their attention on the Jones market in the black community.

Under orders from the Dons, Giancana was instructed to remove Jones from his position and take over. To avoid being murdered by the mob, Jones walked away from his enterprise.

Detroit
A 1941 trial exposed Detroit's extensive numbers operations. Among the policy houses operating were "Big Four Mutuale" (owned by John Roxborough, boxer Joe Louis's manager), "Yellow Dog" (owned by Everett Watson), "Tia Juana", "Interstate", "Mexico and Villa" (operated by Louis Weisberg), "New York", "Michigan", and others. Big Four was said in testimony to be doing $800,000 business a year, with profits of up to $6000 a week. Yellow Dog was said to be doing $4,900 daily in business, totaling $1.5 million annually. The grand jury in a trial of 71 defendants charged that 10 policy houses had been paying $600 a month in payoffs equally divided between the chief of police, the head prosecutor and the mayor, with smaller bribes in the $25 to $50 range going to individual police sergeants and lieutenants. Former mayor Richard Reading was said to have received $18,000 in payoffs. Reading, Roxborough, Watson, and several others were convicted on conspiracy charges, with Roxborough receiving a - to 5-year sentence, and Reading sentenced to four to five years.

Cleveland
Benny Mason, of the "B&M" policy house, and Buster Mathews of the "Goldfield" policy house, were the main kingpins of the numbers game in 1930s and 1940s Cleveland. In a 1935 raid on the B&M house on E. 46th St., police found 200 policy writers on hand who had handed in their books and were waiting for the payoff. In a 1949 arrest, police picked up a 35-year-old woman named Robinson who told them she had been a policy writer for the past month and a half, at $40 a week. She was writing slips for the Old Kentucky, Goldfield and Last Chance games, and her top sheet showed that she had written $500 in business on that day (which happened to be Good Friday) alone.

By the 1950s, there were eight rival numbers games operating in black sections of Cleveland, including "California Gold", "Mound Bayou" and "T. & O." The winning three-digit number from 000 to 999 was determined by the closing stock market results in the evening papers, with one digit each being taken from the totals for advances, declines, and unchanged. Bets of up to $2 would be placed with hundreds of numbers writers around the city, who would keep 25% of the money bet as their fee. In the mid-afternoon a runner (locally known as the pickup man or woman) would rendezvous with the writers to collect the policy slips and cash, which would be taken to a central location and totaled on adding machines prior to determining the winners. The runners kept 10% of the money bet as their fee. 65 cents on every dollar bet would be delivered to the "clearinghouse" parlors, which calculated the winners and paid off at 500 to 1 odds, keeping 15 cents on the dollar, on an average day when no "hot" number hit, for themselves. In the evening the runner would make the rounds again to deliver the cash winnings to those writers whose customers had hit the winning number, and winners would be paid. A number of bars, private clubs and taverns around town, including the "Tia Juana", served as centers of the action where bettors and writers would congregate and wait for the winners to be announced.

After a 1955 car bombing in which the girlfriend of Arthur "Little Brother" Drake was killed, police conducted a mass roundup of 28 numbers operators and runners on the east side, including Drake, Geech Bell, Don King, Edward Keeling, Dan Boone, Thomas Turk, and others. The following year Jewish gangster Shon Birns tried to keep the peace by setting up a 5-member syndicate of the leading black operators in Cleveland including Don King, Virgil Ogletree, Boone and Keeling to control the game, insure payouts when "hot" numbers which had been overbet hit for large scores, and limit the payoff odds to 500 to 1; Birns also attempted to introduce a new method of determining the winning number. The game was wildly popular; in the 1950s one Cleveland numbers house was said to clear $20,000 a day.

Atlanta

In Atlanta the game was known as "playing the bug." In 1936 The Atlanta Constitution wrote: "Both in the business section and the residential areas, one or more solicitors make their daily morning rounds into every office and every home.  Then, in the afternoons, the "pay-off" men make their rounds over the same routes.  Their patrons include every class of Atlanta citizens—professional men, businessmen, housewives, and even children."   "The bug" was believed by police to be grossing citywide as much as $30,000 in bets a day at its height in 1937–1938.  During a police crackdown in 1943, authorities claimed that the game was in decline and "they are lucky if they bank as much as $12,000 to $15,000 a day," after a raid on an alleged headquarters on Parsons Street. In 1944, eight bug rings were believed to be operating in the city, collectively handling a total of $15,000 to $20,000 in bets on an average day. Writers took out a 25% commission before passing on the rest of the day's receipts to the house.
Bug writers employed a number of schemes to foil police: in 1936 police observed writers carrying the day's bet slips gathering under the bridge which passes over the railroad tracks at Nelson St.  As lottery squad officers watched, a pick-up car pulled up and stopped on the bridge overhead, the writers threw their paper sacks full of bet slips up to it, and the car sped off. In 1937 indictments were brought against the alleged "big shots" of the bug game in Atlanta, including Bob Hogg, the Hall brothers (Albert and Leonard), Flem King, Willie Carter, Walter Cutcliffe, Glenn House, and Henry F. Shorter. Henry Shorter was a barber who ran the game out of his barber shop.  In 1944, Shorter was one of a select group of 20 African-American community leaders who were turned away from the polls when they attempted to vote in the Democratic primary; the Rev. M.L. King, father of Martin Luther King Jr., was among the others who participated in this protest.

Bahamas 
Numbers games are popular in many Bahamian communities. While gambling in casinos is legal for tourists visiting the Bahamas, it is forbidden for Bahamian residents. There is also no legalized lottery for Bahamian nationals. As a result, the predominant form of gambling among residents is playing the Numbers.

New York City
The Italian lottery was operated as a racket for the American Mafia, originally in Italian-American neighborhoods such as Little Italy, Manhattan and Italian Harlem by mobsters of the Morello crime family. A young Joseph Bonanno, future boss of the Bonanno crime family, expanded the Italian lottery operation to all of Brooklyn and invested the profits in many legitimate businesses.  In the 1930s, Vito Genovese, crime boss of the Genovese crime family, ruled the Italian lottery in New York and New Jersey, bringing in over $1 million per year, owned four Greenwich Village night clubs, a dog track in Virginia, and other legitimate businesses.

Dutch Schultz is said to have rigged this system, thanks to an idea from Otto Berman, by betting heavily on certain races to change the Win, Place and Show numbers that determine the winning lottery number. This allegedly added ten percent to the Mob take.

Harlem
Francis A. J. Ianni, in his book Black Mafia: Ethnic Succession in Organized Crime writes: "By 1925 there were thirty black policy banks in Harlem, several of them large enough to collect bets in an area of twenty city blocks and across three or four avenues." By 1931, big time numbers operators in Harlem included James Warner, Stephanie St. Clair ("Madame Queen"), Casper Holstein, Ellsworth "Bumpy" Johnson, Wilfred Brunder, Jose Miro, Joseph Ison, Masjoe Ison and Simeon Francis. The game survived despite periodic police crackdowns.

Legal lotteries

Today, many state lotteries offer similar "daily numbers" games, typically relying on mechanical devices to draw the number. The state's rake is typically 50% rather than the 20–40% of the numbers game. The New York Lottery and Pennsylvania Lottery even use the names "Numbers" and "Daily Number" respectively. Despite the existence of legal alternatives, some gamblers still prefer to play with a bookie for a number of reasons. Among them are the ability to bet on credit, better payoffs, the convenience of calling in one's bet on the telephone, the ability to play if under the legal age, and the avoidance of government taxes.

Gameplay
One of the problems of the early game was to find a way to draw a random number. Initially, winning numbers were set by the daily outcome of a random drawing of numbered balls, or by spinning a "policy wheel," at the headquarters of the local numbers ring. The daily outcomes were publicized by being posted after the draw at the headquarters, and were often "fixed." The existence of rigged games, used to cheat players and drive competitors out of business, as well as the practical obstacles to holding a drawing for a lottery that is illegal, later led to the use of widely published unpredictable numbers, such as the last three numbers in the published daily balance of the United States Treasury, or the middle three digits of the number of shares traded that day on the New York Stock Exchange.

This is what led to the change from the game of policy, in which 12 or 13 numbers from 1 to 78 were drawn, and players bet on combinations of four or fewer of them, to the "numbers game," in which players chose a three-digit number to bet on.

The use of a central, independently-chosen number allowed for gamblers from a larger area to engage in the same game and also made larger wins possible. It also gave customers confidence in the fairness of the games, which could still generate vast profits even if run honestly, as they paid out only around $600 for every $1,000 wagered.

When the Treasury began rounding off the balance, many bookies began to use the "mutuel" number. This consisted of the last dollar digit of the daily total handle of the Win, Place and Show bets at a local race track, read from top to bottom. For example, if the daily handle (takings at the racetrack) was:
 Win    $1004.25
 Place   $583.56
 Show     $27.61
then the daily number was 437.
By 1936, "The Bug" had spread to cities such as Atlanta, where the winning number was determined by the last digit of that day's New York bond sales.

Policy dealers
 Albert J. Adams (1845–1906), operator of policy game in New York City in the 1900s
 Ken Eto (1919–2004), operator of policy game in Chicago
 Giosue Gallucci (1865–1915), operator of Italian policy game in Italian Harlem in the 1910s, known as the King of Little Italy
 Tony Grosso (1913–1994), operator of numbers game in Pittsburgh
 Dutch Schultz (1901-1935), had a gang war with Stephanie St. Clair and Bumpy Johnson over the numbers racket in the 1930's
 Don King (born 1931), operator of a policy game in Cleveland before achieving fame as a boxing promoter
 Peter H. Matthews, operator of policy game in New York City in the 1900s
 Sai Wing Mock (1879–1941), operator of policy game in Chinatown, New York in the 1900s
 Joseph Vincent Moriarty, operator of numbers game in Hudson County, New Jersey in the 1950s
 Stephanie St. Clair (1886–1969), known as "Madame Queen", operator of policy game in Harlem, in the 1920s and early 1930s.

Policy reformers
 Lexow Committee, uncovered illegal gambling in New York City
 Charles Henry Parkhurst
 F. Norton Goddard

Timeline
 1860 Private lotteries flourish in large cities
 1894 Lexow Committee investigates
 1901 Albert J. Adams arrested in New York City
 1906 Albert J. Adams takes his own life
 1916 Peter H. Matthews dies in prison
 1964 New Hampshire starts the first modern US lottery

In popular culture

 Old Policy Wheel is a 1935 painting by Walter Ellison, depicting a scene in a Chicago basement betting parlor.
 In the 1946 film noir The Killers, the Swede (Burt Lancaster) moves, fatally, from boxing to crime. The first criminal activity he is involved in is "the numbers racket."
 The 1948 film noir Force of Evil revolves around the numbers racket, with the plot hinging upon the workings of policy banks. The film tells of a gangster who is trying to take over all the banks in New York City by rigging the mutuel numbers to come up 776 on Independence Day. Since everybody plays those numbers for the Fourth of July, the banks will go bankrupt filling the policies.
 The 1949 song "Grandma Plays the Numbers" by Wynonie Harris refers to the singer's elderly grandmother being addicted to playing numbers.
 In the 1957 novel A Rage in Harlem by Chester Himes, the numbers are mentioned numerous times, including as an excuse for how the main character has come into a large amount of money.
 In the 19th episode, "The Breaking of the Habit", of the fourth season of the TV series The Fugitive (1963–1967), Dr. Richard Kimble is heading to a fictional town, Tarleton, 100 miles away from Sacramento, California where he discovers the murderer of his wife, Fred Johnson, works as a runner in the local numbers racket.
 In the 1972 film The Godfather, Sonny Corleone and members of the Corleone family discuss their concern  that black gangs have taken over their "policy banks" due to the turmoil caused by the gang wars between the Corleones and other New York City Mafia families.
 In the 1972 film Shaft's Big Score!, John Shaft investigates the death of his friend, Cal Asby, and discovers that while Asby appeared to be a beloved community member, he was also tied to a local numbers racket.  A scene shows a character going door to door in a housing project, collecting money and handing out numbered slips.  Missing money from this local numbers game is central to the film.
 In the 1972 film The French Connection, Popeye Doyle identifies "that policy guy from Queens" in a bar he and his partner are staking out.
 Season 2, Episode 1 (September 1972) of Sanford and Son titled "By the Numbers" featured Fred Sanford hitting on the numbers game, winning $600 on a $1 bet.
 The 1973 film Book of Numbers follows a pair of grifters who bring a numbers bank to a small Arkansas town during the 1930s.
 In the 1978 film adaptation of The Wiz the Good Witch of the North, Miss One, is a number runner, and her entire personality, way of speaking, and wardrobe is built around numbers.
 In the 1984 film The  Cotton Club A subplot features the turf war between Dutch Shultz and the Black controllers of the Harlem numbers racket, Madam St. Clair and Bumpy Rhodes. Shultz used the mathematical calculating ability of "Abbadabba" Berman to manipulate the final numbers in his favor, a reflection of true life events. 
 In the 1990 film Goodfellas, one of young Henry Hill's first jobs working for the Mob is as a numbers runner.
 A subplot of the August Wilson 1990 play Two Trains Running involves several characters placing numbers bets with a bookie character named Wolf. One character, Sterling, has the goal of marrying one of the other characters, Risa, should the number she gave him win.
 The Spike Lee biographic film Malcolm X portrays some of the revolutionary black leader Malcolm X's early days in Harlem, where he worked as a numbers runner for a man named West Indian Archie.
 In the 1995 crime drama film Dead Presidents, Anthony, played by Larenz Tate, works as a young numbers runner before going off to serve in the Vietnam War.
 The numbers racket is the subject of the 1936 film Exclusive Story and is also portrayed in the 1997 film Hoodlum.
 In the 1999 film Liberty Heights, Joe Mantegna's character runs a numbers game.
 Episode 108 of the podcast Criminal, "The Numbers", follows the life of Fannie Davis, a mother in Detroit who becomes a banker in a numbers game to support her family. The episode describes the use of "dream books," which associated symbols or experiences in dreams to possible number combinations, as well as paraphernalia such as candles that revealed number combinations after the wax burned away.

See also

 The Association for Legalizing American Lotteries
 Bookmaker
 Bolita
 Fafi
 Four Eleven Forty Four
 Jogo do bicho
 Jueteng

References

Further reading
 Herbert Asbury, Sucker's Progress: An Informal History of Gambling in America. (1938) pp. 88–106.
 Cooley, Will (2017). "Jim Crow Organized Crime: Black Chicago’s Underground Economy in the Twentieth Century", in Building the Black Metropolis: African American Entrepreneurship in Chicago, Robert Weems and Jason Chambers, eds. Urbana: University of Illinois Press, 147–70. .
 
 
 Liddick, Don. The mob's daily number: Organized crime and the numbers gambling industry (University Press of America, 1999).
 Light, Ivan. "Numbers gambling among blacks: A financial institution." American Sociological Review (1977): 892–904. online
 Kaplan, Lawrence J., and James M. Maher. "The economics of the numbers game." American Journal of Economics and Sociology 29.4 (1970): 391–408. online
 
 
 White, Shane, Stephen Garton, Stephen Robertson and Graham White, Playing the Numbers: Gambling in Harlem Between the Wars. Cambridge, MA: Harvard University Press, 2010. .
 Vaz, Matthew Running the Numbers: Race, Police, and the History of Urban Gambling University of Chicago, Chicago, Illinois 2020

 
Lotteries in the United States
Organized crime activity